Table tennis at the 2019 European Games in Minsk took place from 22 to 29 June 2019 at Tennis Olympic Centre. The three medalists in the men's and women's singles events qualified for the 2020 Summer Olympics while the gold medalists in the men's and women's team events and mixed doubles event received an Olympic quota.

Qualification
Maximum quota per NOC: 2 athletes in each singles event, 1 team in each team event and 1 pair in the mixed doubles.

Singles

Team

Mixed doubles

Summary

Medal summary

Medal table

Medalists

References

 
Sports at the 2019 European Games
European Games
2019